The following is a list of musical scales and modes. Degrees are relative to the major scale.

See also

Bebop scale
Chord-scale system
Heptatonic scale
Jazz scale
List of chord progressions
List of chords
List of musical intervals
List of pitch intervals
Arabian maqam
Modes of limited transposition
Symmetric scale
Synthetic modes
Tetrachord

External links
 A free Android app with scales & building chords for the scales
 A Study Of Scales
 The Universal Encyclopedia of Scales

 List
Scales and modes
Music theory